Beyond London Lights is a lost 1928 American silent drama film directed by Tom Terriss and starring Adrienne Dore, Lee Shumway, and Bill Elliott. It is based on John Joy Bell's 1917 novel Kitty Carstairs, and is sometimes referred to by that title. It was made by Film Booking Offices of America.

Cast
 Adrienne Dore as Kitty Carstairs 
 Lee Shumway as John Risk 
 Wild Bill Elliott as Colin Drummond 
 Herbert Evans as Symington 
 Jacqueline Gadsden as Lady Dorothy 
 Florence Wix as Mrs. Drummond 
 Templar Saxe as Stephen Carstairs 
 Blanche Craig as Mrs. Bundle 
 Kathrin Clare Ward as The Landlady

References

Bibliography
 Goble, Alan. The Complete Index to Literary Sources in Film.

External links
 
 

1928 films
1928 drama films
1920s English-language films
American silent feature films
Silent American drama films
Films based on British novels
Films directed by Tom Terriss
Films set in London
American black-and-white films
Film Booking Offices of America films
Lost American films
1928 lost films
Lost drama films
1920s American films